Hollywood is the name of several Disney entities:

 Hollywood Pictures, a former film production label of The Walt Disney Studios
 Hollywood Records, an American record label
 Disney's Hollywood Studios, a theme park at the Walt Disney World Resort in Florida